Mississippi Highway 492 (MS 492) is a state highway in central Mississippi that consists of two separate segments. The western segment runs in the vicinity of Walnut Grove and Golden Memorial State Park. The eastern segment runs much longer and travels from Sebastopol to House, Neshoba County.

Route description
The western segment of MS 492 begins just outside of the town of Walnut Grove in southern Leake County at MS 35. The road, known as Sylvanus Street, heads east and almost immediately reaches the town limits of Walnut Grove. The highway makes a sharp curve to the north where its name changes to Main Street. MS 492, traveling through the southernmost portion of the town where some businesses exist along the road, reaches an intersection with Chadwick Avenue. MS 878 continues north along Main Street here while MS 492 sharply curves to the southeast along Chadwick Avenue, passing more businesses. The road heads into a more wooded area as it passes the closed Walnut Grove Correctional Facility and exits the town limits. Crossing into Scott County, the road heads generally east along rolling hills, passing the entrance to Golden Memorial State Park. After the park entrance, state maintenance of the road ends and the road simply becomes known as Damascus Road.

MS 492 heads southeast along Main Street mostly heading past houses. The road exits Sebastopol and Scott County by crossing into Newton County. Heading east, MS 492 travels through a mix of woods and open fields. It skirts the Neshoba County line before entering the town of Union along Jackson Road. Crossing a railroad at-grade, the state highway travels through the center of town where it passes businesses, some houses, churches, and the northern terminus of MS 489. Towards the east side of town, MS 492 crosses MS 15. It then travels in a more northeasterly direction, crossing into a rural Neshoba County. MS 492 crosses the divided MS 19 and then heads into the unincorporated community of House. It passes a store and some service stations before reaching an intersection with County Road 298 (CR 298) and CR 4300 in the community. State maintenance of the road, thus the formal end of the state highway, ends just before the intersection.

Three segments of MS 492 have formal memorial designations: Blue Star Memorial Highway within the corporate limits of Union, Robert L. Holliman Memorial Highway between Union and MS 19, and Fire Chief Mickey Lewis Yates in western Newton County.

History
The first segment of MS 492 that was created was between Sebastopol and Union in 1950 along an unimproved road. The road had been fully paved by 1953. It was extended to the west to Walnut Grove (by traveling south along a portion of MS 21 from Sebastopol) and to the east to House in 1957. Between 1965 and 1967, the segment west of Sebastopol was removed from the state highway system, however a portion of it in the immediate vicinity of Walnut Grove was restored by 1977. The highway has generally remained the same since.

A extension of MS 492 further west has been proposed in Leake County since the late 1950s. It would begin at MS 487 near Tuscola and travel east through the Tuscolameta Creek valley before ending at MS 35 north of Walnut Grove. The future segment to-date remains a part of the state highway segment.

Major intersections

References

External links

492
Transportation in Leake County, Mississippi
Transportation in Scott County, Mississippi
Transportation in Newton County, Mississippi
Transportation in Neshoba County, Mississippi